Valvo is a surname. Notable people with the surname include:

Ángel Lo Valvo (1909–1978), Argentine racing driver
Carmen Marc Valvo, American fashion designer
Michael Valvo (1942–2004), American chess player